Pseudotrachydium is a genus of flowering plants belonging to the family Apiaceae.

Its native range is Turkey to Central Asia and Pakistan.

Species:

Pseudotrachydium depressum 
Pseudotrachydium dichotomum 
Pseudotrachydium kotschyi 
Pseudotrachydium pauciradiatum 
Pseudotrachydium vesiculosoalatum

References

Apioideae
Apioideae genera